PT Asuransi Jasa Indonesia or known as Asuransi Jasindo is an Indonesian company engaged in service insurance. In 2020, the company officially became a member of the state-owned insurance holding company, after the majority of its shares held by the government were handed over to Bahana Pembinaan Usaha Indonesia.

History

Starting in the period of transition of sovereignty from the Dutch colonial government to the Government of the Republic of Indonesia, a number of insurance companies belonging to the Dutch colonial have been nationalized, including NV Assurantie Maatshappij De Nederlandern and Bloom Vander EE in 1845 which are domiciled in Jakarta. Initially, the loss insurance has been running its business to provide risk protection for plantation companies and so on.

After Indonesia became fully independent, the former Dutch and British general insurance companies were nationalized to become PT Asuransi Bendasraya. Along with the pace of national development which requires broader loss insurance protection services for each development process, the government has adopted a policy of business combination.

Through the Decree of the Minister of Finance No. 764/MK/IV/12/1972, on June 2, 1973, PT Asuransi Bendasraya which was engaged in rupiah insurance and PT General Internasional Underwriters (PT UIU) which was engaged in foreign exchange insurance were merged into PT Asuransi Jasa Indonesia, which is now better known as Jasindo Insurance.

Office
Asuransi Jasindo currently has 40 Branch Offices and 33 Sales Offices, spread throughout Indonesia

References

Insurance companies of Indonesia
Financial services companies established in 1973
Indonesian brands
Government-owned companies of Indonesia
Government-owned insurance companies
Indonesian companies established in 1973